Rey Leonardo Borja Guerrero is a retired general of the Philippine Army serving as the Commissioner of the Bureau of Customs under the Duterte administration since 2018. He is a member of the PMA "Maharlika" Class of 1984.
Previously, he was the administrator of the Maritime Industry Authority (MARINA) from April to October 2018 and was the Chief of Staff of the Armed Forces of the Philippines from October 2017 to April 2018.

Background
Before entering military service, he was a student in the University of the Philippines Diliman, where he took his PMA Exams in 1980 before entering the Philippine Military Academy (PMA) the same year, and graduated as a member of the PMA "Maharlika" class of 1984. He was known to be strict, determined, well rounded, and serious, yet very kind-hearted and a great leader, and also attended various military courses locally and abroad, such as the AFP Command and General Staff Course, and the Basic Airborne Course, among others. He is also a qualified member of the Special Forces.

During his 38 years in military service (including spending a total of 4 years as a PMA Cadet), he served as the former commander of the 61st Infantry Battalion of the 3rd Infantry Division, the 701st Infantry Brigade of the 7th Infantry Division, and the Presidential Security Group under the term of then President Gloria Macapagal Arroyo. He also commanded the Special Operations Command and also served as the former Philippine Army chief of staff, where he earned his second star and was promoted to Major General. He also served as commander of the 3rd Infantry Division, before being named as the commander of the AFP Eastern Mindanao Command, where he earned his third star and was promoted to Lieutenant General.

He is often called as "Jagger" as his nickname in the military. He was appointed as the Chief of Staff of the Armed Forces of the Philippines on October 26, 2017, with his term as Chief of Staff of the AFP was extended by President Rodrigo Duterte from December 17, 2017, until April 18, 2018, allowing him to serve his term beyond the mandatory retirement age at 56. He was replaced by the commander of the AFP Western Mindanao Command then-Lieutenant General Carlito Galvez Jr. on April 18, 2018.

After his retirement in the AFP, he was named by President Rodrigo Duterte as the next head of the Marina (Maritime Industry Authority), as the agency's administrator after he retired in the AFP. In October 2018, Guerrero was named Commissioner of the Bureau of Customs by President Rodrigo Duterte, replacing Isidro Lapeña after the latter was dismissed and given a new position in TESDA.

Awards
Left Side:

Right Side:

Badges and Other Awards:
  AFP Parachutist Badge
  Special Forces Qualification Badge
  Combat Commander's Badge
  AFP Command and General Staff Course Badge
 Honorary Airborne Wings - From The Royal Thai Army
 Ulirang Alumnus ng Akademya - from the PMA

Personal life
He is married to Jayne R. Guerrero and has four children.

References 

Living people
Philippine Army generals
Chairmen of the Joint Chiefs (Philippines)
Philippine Military Academy alumni
Duterte administration personnel
Heads of government agencies of the Philippines
Recipients of the Presidential Medal of Merit (Philippines)
Recipients of the Philippine Legion of Honor
Recipients of the Distinguished Service Star
Recipients of the Gold Cross (Philippines)